Roberta McCallum Russo (born November 3, 1958) is a former professional tennis player from the United States.

Biography

Tennis career
McCallum went to high school in Mount Lebanon, Pennsylvania, then attended Pepperdine University, playing collegiate tennis with the Waves in 1977 and 1978.

She spent two years playing on the professional tour, with her breakthrough performance a semi-final appearance at the Greater Pittsburgh Open in 1979, before making her first overseas tour in Australia at the end of the year. At the 1980 Avon Championships of Los Angeles she had wins over Pam Shriver and Kathy Jordan to make the quarter-finals and was also a quarter-finalist that year at the US Indoor Championships. As a doubles player she made a WTA Tour final in 1981, at the Japan Open, where she and partner Barbara Jordan finished runners-up. During her career she featured in the main draw of the French Open, Wimbledon Championships and US Open.

Personal life
McCallum was married to former Virginia Tech football captain Vince Russo, before his death in 1995, at the age of 45. With Vince she has a daughter named Alexandra.

WTA Tour finals

Doubles (0–1)

References

External links
 
 

1958 births
Living people
American female tennis players
Pepperdine Waves women's tennis players
Tennis players from Pittsburgh